Sef Imkamp (10 March 1925, in Beek – 2 July 2013, in The Hague) was a Dutch politician.

References

1925 births
2013 deaths
Democrats 66 politicians
Dutch legal scholars
Members of the House of Representatives (Netherlands)
People from Beek
Radboud University Nijmegen alumni